The 2015 Triple J Hottest 100 was announced Australia Day, 26 January 2016. It is the 23rd countdown of the most popular songs of the year, as chosen by the listeners of Australian radio station Triple J.

Voting commenced on 9 December 2015, and closed on 22 January 2016. Voters nominated ten songs that were released between December 2014 and November 2015 and submitted them through the Triple J website. Over 2 million votes were again cast, this year from 172 countries. 54 songs in the 2015 Hottest 100 are by Australian artists, with 26 artists of any nationality making their debut.

Despite a betting agency's campaign aimed at getting Justin Bieber featured in the list, similar to 2014's #Tay4Hottest100, Triple J announced no songs have been disqualified from the 2015 list.

Full list

 Number 101 was "Call My Name" by Perth duo Mosquito Coast, who were discovered through Triple J Unearthed.

Artists with multiple entries

Four entries
 Tame Impala (4, 5, 34, 61)
 Courtney Barnett (43, 75, 82, 95)

Three entries
 Major Lazer (3, 74, 98)
 The Wombats (29, 67, 91)
 Florence and the Machine (38, 40, 70)
 Bring Me the Horizon (45, 86, 99)

Two entries
 Kendrick Lamar (2, 37)
 DJ Snake (3, 17)
 MØ (Once solo and once with Major Lazer) (3, 60)
 The Weeknd (9, 19)
 Disclosure (10, 62)
 RÜFÜS (12, 28)
 SAFIA (23, 35)
 Flume (Once solo and once with What So Not) (24, 90)
 Jamie xx (26, 31)
 Chvrches (32, 51)
 Halsey (42, 94)
 Parkway Drive (48, 58)
 ASAP Rocky (64, 80)
 Thelma Plum (Once with Golden Features and once with Tuka) (81, 92)
 Flight Facilities (83, 85)

Countries represented
 Australia – 54
 United Kingdom – 26
 United States – 20
 Canada – 5
 New Zealand – 3
 Jamaica – 2
 Denmark – 2
 France – 2
 Germany – 1
 Papua New Guinea – 1
 Sweden – 1

Notes
 The Rubens are the first winning artist since Augie March in 2006 to only feature once in the countdown. Their next closest entry was "Hallelujah" at number 121, which was announced in the "second Hottest 100" (places 200 to 101), revealed on 31 January.
 The Rubens are also the second Unearthed artist to win the Hottest 100 after Vance Joy in 2013.
 Ngaiire is the first Papua New Guinean to chart in the Hottest 100 countdown.
 The song "Delete" by DMA's charted in the countdown for the second year in a row after a cover by Sticky Fingers featured at number 84. Similarly "Big Jet Plane" by Angus & Julia Stone which won the countdown in 2010 came in at number 81 with a cover by Tuka.
 The 2015 list features 11 different nationalities, breaking the record of 10 from 2013 and 2014.
 With their two entries in this year's list Flight Facilities have now had seven songs from their album Down to Earth in the countdown. This equals the record set by Wolfmother from their debut Wolfmother.
 The song "Cream On Chrome" by Ratatat is the only instrumental song to make the countdown, and is the 5th instrumental song to appear in the Hottest 100 since 1999.

Top 10 Albums of 2015
A poll of Triple J listeners' favourite albums of the year was held in December 2015. Melbourne singer-songwriter Courtney Barnett won the J Award for her album.

Bold indicates winner.

References

2015 in Australian music
Australia Triple J
2015